Carbet Falls is a series of waterfalls on the Carbet River in Guadeloupe, an overseas department of France located in the Leeward Islands of the eastern Caribbean region. Its three cascades are set amid the tropical rainforests on the lower slopes of the volcano La Soufrière. The falls are one of the most popular visitor sites in Guadeloupe, with approximately 400,000 visitors annually.

In 1493, Christopher Columbus noted Carbet Falls in his log.

Description

The second cascade receives the most visitors of the three, due to its convenient accessibility. Many hot springs, including Little Paradise Hot Spring, are located nearby.

The third and last cascade measures  in height, and has the greatest water volume of any waterfall in Guadeloupe. It is only accessible on foot, and only to experienced hikers.

Recent events
Following an earthquake in 2004, several cubic meters of rock split from the cliff face behind the second cascade. The safety hazard thus created led park authorities to limit access to the cascade to no closer than a bridge just downstream. Heavy rains in 2005 and 2009 only exacerbated the problem by leaving the terrain more unstable.

See also
Guadeloupe National Park

References

External links
 

Landforms of Guadeloupe
Waterfalls of France
Waterfalls of North America
Tourist attractions in Guadeloupe
Tiered waterfalls
Articles containing video clips